is a railway station in Chūō, Tokyo, Japan, operated by both the Tokyo Metro and the East Japan Railway Company (JR East).

Lines
It is located 9.7 km from the starting point of the Hibiya Line at Kita-Senju, and 1.2 km from the western terminus of the Keiyō Line at Tokyo Station.

Station layout
Hatchōbori Station consists of two individual stations run by different rail operators connected by underground passageways.

Tokyo Metro platforms
The Tokyo Metro station consists of an underground island platform serving two tracks.

JR East platforms
The JR East station also consists of an underground island platform serving two tracks. The JR line platform is deeper underground than the Hibiya Line platform.

History
The Tokyo Metro (formerly Eidan) station opened on 28 February 1963. The JR East station opened on 10 March 1990.

The station facilities of the Hibiya Line were inherited by Tokyo Metro after the privatization of the Teito Rapid Transit Authority (TRTA) in 2004.

Station numbering was introduced to the JR East platforms in 2016 with Hatchobori being assigned station number JE02.

Passenger statistics
In fiscal 2010, the JR East station was used by an average of 28,969 passengers daily (boarding passengers only).

Surrounding area
The station is located in the Hatchōbori neighbourhood of Chūō, Tokyo.

See also

 List of railway stations in Japan

References

External links

 Tokyo Metro station information 
 JR East station information 

Railway stations in Japan opened in 1963
Tokyo Metro Hibiya Line
Stations of Tokyo Metro
Railway stations in Tokyo